Fed Baby's is a collaborative mixtape between rappers Moneybagg Yo and YoungBoy Never Broke Again. It was released on November 16, 2017 through Never Broke Again, Bread Gang Entertainment, Collective Music Group, Atlantic Records, Interscope Records and N-Less Entertainment. The mixtape has two features from Young Thug and Quavo. The day after the mixtape was released, YoungBoy dissed MoneyBagg Yo in a video posted to Instagram, saying: "Fuck that tape! And I want smoke, bitch I ain't playin'". The mixtape later debuted at number 21 on the US Billboard 200.

Track listing

Charts

References 

2017 mixtape albums
Moneybagg Yo albums
YoungBoy Never Broke Again albums